Macropholidus ataktolepis is a species of lizard in the family Gymnophthalmidae. It is endemic to Peru.

References

Macropholidus
Reptiles of Peru
Endemic fauna of Peru
Reptiles described in 1995
Taxa named by John Everett Cadle
Taxa named by Pablo Chuna Mogollón